Eterobarb (Antilon) is a barbiturate derivative. It has mainly anticonvulsant action with less sedative effects than the closely related compound phenobarbital. It saw reasonable success in clinical trials, but is not in widespread medical use.

Synthesis
Eterobarb can be synthesized by reacting phenobarbital with chloromethyl methyl ether in presence of a base.

References 

Barbiturates
Ethers
GABAA receptor positive allosteric modulators